Bogus Jim Creek is a stream in the U.S. state of South Dakota.

According to one tradition the creek has the name of Francis "Bogus Jim" Calabogus, a pioneer settler; another tradition maintains the creek was called "bogus" because it was dry.

See also
List of rivers of South Dakota

References

Rivers of Pennington County, South Dakota
Rivers of South Dakota